For people with the surname, see Frosini (surname).

Frosini is a village in Tuscany, central Italy, administratively a frazione of the comune of Chiusdino, province of Siena. At the time of the 2001 census its population was 45.

References 

Frazioni of Chiusdino